Marlon Ian Black (born 7 June 1975, Trinidad and Tobago) is a former West Indian cricketer who played in six Tests and five ODIs, debuting in 2000.

He played his last international in 2002 due largely to an incident where he was attacked and badly beaten outside a Melbourne nightclub. Black had been out clubbing with his teammates Wavell Hinds and Sylvester Joseph to mark the end of their tour. Walking back to their hotel, they came across four drunk men smashing bottles on the road. The two groups got into a confrontation and when the men got aggressive the cricketers tried to flee. Hinds and Joseph got away but Black was knocked unconscious after being badly beaten.

Black now lives in Sunderland in England and has four children, having played club cricket for Sefton Park (1999), Huyton (2000–2003), Sunderland (2004–2005), Northern (2006), Bamford Fieldhouse (2008–2013), Crompton(2014) and Hylton since 2015.

References

1975 births
Living people
West Indies Test cricketers
West Indies One Day International cricketers
Trinidad and Tobago expatriates in the United Kingdom
Trinidad and Tobago cricketers
Cheshire cricketers